Goniobranchus albonares is a species of colourful sea slug, a dorid nudibranch, a marine gastropod mollusc in the family Chromodorididae.

Distribution
This species was described from North West Solitary Island, Coffs Harbour, New South Wales, Australia. It has been reported from New Caledonia, Bali and Japan and the Marshall Islands.

References

Chromodorididae
Gastropods described in 1990